A list of notable flat horse races which take place annually in Japan. Except for the Tokyo Daishoten, all graded races are operated Japan Racing Association, including all conditions races which currently hold Grade 1, 2 or 3 status. In Japanese, it is called , lit Big race.

Grade 1

The 2003 running took place at Nakayama while Tokyo was closed for redevelopment.

The 1979 running took place at Hanshin.

The 1993 running took place at Kyoto.

The 2011 running took place at Hanshin while Chukyo was closed for redevelopment.

The 1991 running took place at Kyoto while Hanshin was closed for redevelopment.

The 1995 running took place at Kyoto while Hanshin was closed due to 1995 Great Hanshin earthquake.

The 1939-1943 runnings took place at Nakayama, the 1944 running took place at Tokyo and the 1947, 1948 and 1949 runnings took place at Kyoto as Hanshin had not finished construction.

The 1939-1942 runnings took place at Yokohama.

The 1943, 1944, 1947, 1948, 1956, 1963, 1964, 1974, 1976 and 1988 runnings took place at Tokyo.

The 2011 running took place at Tokyo while Nakayama was closed due to 2011 Tohoku earthquake and tsunami.

The 1994 running took place at Hanshin.

The 2021 and 2022 runnings took place at Hanshin while Kyoto was closed for redevelopment.

The 1938-1942 runnings took place at Hanshin.

The 1943 running took place at Kyoto.

The 1932 and 1933 runnings took place at Meguro.

The 1967 running took place at Nakayama.

The 1966, 1969, 1974 and 1976 runnings took place at Kyoto.

The 1980 running took place at Chukyo.

The 1991 and 2006 runnings took place at Kyoto while Hanshin was closed for redevelopment.

The 1980 running took place at Tokyo.

The 2002 running took place at Niigata.

The 2014 running took place at Niigata while Nakayama was closed for redevelopment.

The 2002 running took place at Nakayama while Tokyo was closed for redevelopment.

The 2020, 2021 and 2022 runnings took place at Hanshin while Kyoto was closed for redevelopment.

The 2000, 2001 and 2003-2007 runnings took place at Tokyo.

The 2002 running took place at Nakayama.

The 2008-2012 runnings took place at Hanshin.

The 1956 and 1980 runnings took place at Kyoto.

The 1990 running took place at Kyoto while Hanshin was closed for redevelopment.

The 1949-2013 runnings took place at Nakayama.

The 1984-1989 and 1991-2013 runnings took place at Hanshin.

The 1990 running took place at Kyoto.

Grade 2

Grade 3

Listed
From 2019, Japan Racing Association introduced new "Listed" category, prize value is higher than normal open race.

Other Open Races

NAR Graded Races (As listed race in international)

Former race

References

Horse racing in Japan
Horse racing-related lists